Oru Yugasandhya is a 1986 Indian Malayalam-language film, directed by Madhu and produced by P. K. R. Pillai. The film stars Madhu, Shankar Panicker, Innocent and Srividya. The film has musical score by A. T. Ummer.

Plot
Kottappuram Kuruppu is an ill-tempered head of the aristocratic Nair family. His family consists of his wife Kathamma, 3 daughters and a son. Two of his daughters are married and his sons-in-law are Sreedharan Nair and Gopalan Nair . His son Babu, a mechanic is in love with their caretaker Kuttayi's daughter Ammu. The younger daughter, Sumathi, a school teacher, is in love with her colleague Balachandran.

The family is in financial ruins and Kuruppu owes money to the local money lender, Chettiyar. The rest of the story is about the family's internal struggles when both Sumathi and Babu take different approaches to marry their lovers.

Cast

Soundtrack

References

External links
 

1986 films
1980s Malayalam-language films